Division No. 4 (Pilot Mound) is a census division located within the Pembina Valley Region in the south-central region of the province of Manitoba, Canada. Unlike in some other provinces, census divisions do not reflect the organization of local government in Manitoba. These areas exist solely for the purposes of statistical analysis and presentation; they have no government of their own.

The major industry of the Pilot Mound is mixed farming and livestock. Also included in the division is the main reserve of the Swan Lake First Nation.

Demographics 

Municipalities

 Argyle
 Cartwright – Roblin
 Lorne (part in Division No. 8)
 Louise
 Pembina

Unincorporated communities

 Cartwright
 Crystal City
 Manitou
 Pilot Mound
 Somerset

First Nations reserves

 Swan Lake 7

References

External links
Manitoba Regional Profiles: Pembina Valley Region
Pembina Valley Development Corporation
Pembina Valley Tourism 

04
Pembina Valley Region